The ECAC Hockey All-Tournament Team is an honor bestowed at the conclusion of the conference tournament to the players judged to have performed the best during the championship. Currently the team is composed of three forwards, two defensemen and one goaltender with additional players named in the event of a tie. Voting for the honor is conducted by the head coaches of each member team once the tournament has completed and any player regardless of their team's finish is eligible.

The All-Tournament Team was first awarded after the premier championship in 1962 as was a Second-Team. This format continued until 1972 after which the All-Tournament team was abolished until 1988 tournament when only one All-Tournament Team was named. Since then it has continued unchanged. (as of 2014)

All-Tournament Teams

1960s

1970s

1980s

1990s

2000s

2010s

2020s

All-Tournament Team players by school

Current members

Former Members

Multiple appearances

All-Tournament Second Teams

1960s

1970s

All-Tournament Second Team players by school

Current members

Multiple appearances

See also
ECAC Hockey Awards
Most Outstanding Player in Tournament

References

External links
ECAC Hockey

College ice hockey trophies and awards in the United States